Whamamerica! (also promoted as Make It Big Tour ‘85) was a concert tour by English musical duo Wham!. The tour was launched following the success of their 1984 certified multi-platinum studio album Make It Big, which sold four million copies in the United States by the end of the year. The tour spanned nineteen days between August and September 1985, comprising nine shows across the United States and Canada.

Overview
The Whamamerica! tour began in late August 1985. It travelled around the United States, opening at Poplar Creek Music Theater in Illinois in the Midwest, then heading across the border to Canada and all the way down the West Coast to northern and Southern California, south to Texas and then back east to Philadelphia and Detroit. Michael’s look had changed with his hair cut to a shorter length and the colour being close to his natural darker shade. He also had a new designer stubble and larger earrings, a yellow fringed jacket and leather gloves. Their last ever live US performance was at the Pontiac Silverdome in Detroit. They had played to over 302,568 fans.

Opening acts
 Katrina and the Waves (Los Angeles, Houston, Oakland, Miami and Philadelphia)
 The Pointer Sisters (Toronto, Oakland, Miami) 
 Chaka Khan (Los Angeles, Philadelphia)

Set list

Philadelphia

 "Everything She Wants"
 "Credit Card Baby"
 "Blue (Armed with Love)"
 "If You Were There" 
 "The Edge of Heaven"
 "Like a Baby"
 "Wham Rap! (Enjoy What You Do)"
 "Heartbeat"
 "Where Did Your Heart Go?"
 "Love Machine"
 "Wake Me Up Before You Go-Go"
 "Freedom"
 "Careless Whisper"
 "Good Times"
 "Everything She Wants"

Tour dates

Personnel
George Michael - Lead vocals
Andrew Ridgeley - Guitarist

See also
Wham! discography
George Michael discography

References 

George Michael concert tours
1985 concert tours